The Tom Bevill Lock and Dam, formerly named Aliceville Lock and Dam and "Memphis Lock and Dam", is one of four lock and dam structures on the Tennessee-Tombigbee Waterway that generally lie along the original course of the Tombigbee River.  It is located near Aliceville, Alabama and impounds Aliceville Lake. It is named for Tom Bevill, a proponent of the Tenn-Tom.

See also

List of Alabama dams and reservoirs

References

External links
Tennessee-Tombigbee Waterway (U.S. Army Corps of Engineers)

Dams in Alabama
Locks of Alabama
United States Army Corps of Engineers dams
Dams completed in 1978
Tennessee–Tombigbee Waterway
Transportation buildings and structures in Pickens County, Alabama
Crossings of the Tombigbee River